This is a list of notable Algerian people of full or partial ethnic Turkish origin.

Academia
Djelloul Benkalfate educator and socialist (family of Turkish origin)
Abdelhalim Bensmaia, Islamic scholar (family of Turkish origin)
Abdelhalim Ben Smaya, scholar (family of Turkish origin)
Hamdan Khodja, scholar and merchant (father of Turkish origin)
Ibn Hamza al-Maghribi, Ottoman mathematician (Turkish mother)
Malek Bennabi, writer and philosopher (Turkish great-grandfather)

Arts
Hacène Benaboura, artist (family of Turkish origin)
 , painter (family of Turkish origin; nephew of the Racim brothers)
Mohamed-Réda Benabdallah Khodja, artist (from a Constantinian family of Turkish origin)
Mohammed Racim, artist (from an Algerine family of Turkish origin)
Omar Racim, artist and writer (from an Algerine family of Turkish origin)

Cinema
Isabelle Adjani, Algerian-French actress (Algerian father of Turkish origin and German mother)
Ahmed Magdy, Algerian-Egyptian actor (paternal grandmother of Turkish origin)

Literature
Mohamed Bencheneb, writer (ancestors from Bursa)
Lakhdar Ben Cherif, poet (mother of Turkish origin)
Slimane Bengui, director of the first French-language Algerian newspaper "El Hack" (family of Turkish origin)
Ahmed Ben-Triki ("Ben Zengli"), poet (father of Turkish origin)
Leïla Chellabi, writer (Algerian father of Turkish origin)
Mustapha Haciane, poet (family of Turkish origin)
Leïla Sebbar, writer (paternal grandmother from an old Ténès family of Turkish origin)
Wassyla Tamzali, writer (family of Turkish and Spanish origin)

Medicine
Ben Lerbey, possibly the first Algerian doctor (from an old Algerine family of Turkish origin)

Military
Benali Boudghène, resistance fighter (family of Turkish origin)
Abdelmalek Mohieddine, officer (claimed to be from Turkey)

Music
Mahieddine Bachtarzi, actor and singer (from a bourgeois family of Turkish origin)
Mustapha Benkhemmar, master of Andalusian music (family of Turkish origin)
 , master of Andalusian music (was a Kouloughli)
Abdelkrim Dali (fr), musician
Salim Halali, singer (father of Turkish origin and mother of Judeo-Berber origin)
 , musician (Turkish origin)
Hadj Sameer, French musician (Algerian-Turkish origin)
Mustapha Skandrani, pianist, performer of chaâbi music (family from İskenderun) 
Mohamed Sfinja, master of Andalusian music
 , master of the zurna (father of Turkish origin)

Politics
Benaouda Hadj Hacène Bachterzi, municipal councilor in Oran; founder of the "Es-Sandjak" ("l’Etandard") and "Le cri indigene" newspapers (belonged to one of the oldest Algerian-Turkish families)
Mohammed Saleh Bendjelloul, co-founder of the Federation of Elected Natives (native of Constantine and of Turkish origin)
Benyoucef Benkhedda, headed the third GPRA exile government of the National Liberation Front; acted as a leader during the Algerian War (1954–62) (family of Turkish origin)
Lakhdar Ben-Tobbal, resistance fighter (father of Turkish origin)
Abderrahmane Berrouane, politician (mother of Arab and Turkish origin) 
Ahmed Chaouch, caïd (father of Turkish origin)
Ahmed Bey, the last Bey of Constantine (Turkish father and Arab mother)
Ahmed Ben Messali Hadj, often called the "father" of Algerian nationalism (father of Turkish origin)
Mourad Kaouah, Deputy of Algiers (1958–62), French politician, and football player (Turkish origin)
Hasan Pasha, three-times Beylerbey of the Regency of Algiers
 , drew up the Algerian Nationality Code after Algerian independence; Deputy of Constanine (1946) (from one of the old Algerian families of origin Turkish)
Chérif Sid-Cara, doctor and politician in the French Fourth Republic (from an old Algerian family of Turkish origin)
Nafissa Sid-Cara,  first female minister to serve in the French Fifth Republic and the first ever Muslim woman to serve as a minister in a French government (from an old Algerian family of Turkish origin)
Mustapha Stambouli, nationalist leader (family of Turkish origin)

Sports
Patrick Abada, French pole vaulter and Olympian (from an old Algerian family of Turkish origin)
Omar Benmahmoud Ali Raïs, sportsman (Turkish origin)
Benjamin Stambouli, French professional footballer for Schalke 04, Algerian father of Turkish origin (Henri Stambouli)

See also
Turks in Algeria
Kouloughlis
List of governors and rulers of the Regency of Algiers
List of beys of Constantine, Algeria

References

Algerian people of Turkish descent
Turkish
Algerians
Turkish